Revenge Is Sweeter Tour is a video of concert performances by Australian pop rock group The Veronicas. It was shot at the Palais Theatre in Melbourne from 24 to 25 February 2009 during their worldwide Revenge Is Sweeter Tour. The album was also released in the United States with only one thousand copies issued through the group's website.

Track listing

Chart performance
The album charted and peaked at number ninety-one on the ARIA Albums chart where it stayed for three weeks.

References

External links
 

2009 live albums
2009 video albums
Live video albums
The Veronicas albums